Halvad railway station is a railway station in Morbi district, Gujarat, India on the Western line of the Western railway. It serves  Halvad town. Railway Yard is started at Sukhpar Terminal of Halvad. Three Express and two Superfast trains halt here.

Nearby Stations

Dhanala is the nearest railway station towards , whereas Sukhpar is the nearest railway station towards .

Major Trains

Following Express and Superfast trains halt at Halvad railway station in both direction:

 19115/16 Dadar - Bhuj Sayajinagari Express
 22955/56 Bandra Terminus - Bhuj Kutch Superfast Express
 14311/12 Ala Hazrat Express (via Ahmedabad)
 22903/04 Bandra Terminus - Bhuj AC Superfast Express
 11091/92 Bhuj - Pune Express

References 

Railway stations in Morbi district
Ahmedabad railway division